Telephone USA of Wisconsin, LLC is one of the CenturyLink operating companies in Wisconsin. The company's cities include Suring and Gillett.

History
The company was founded in 1999. CenturyTel acquired the company in 2000, adding 62,650 lines at a cost of $170 million.

Proposed sale
On August 3, 2021, Lumen announced its sale of its local telephone assets in 20 states to Apollo Global Management, including Wisconsin.

References

See also
CenturyLink

Telecommunications companies of the United States
Lumen Technologies
Communications in Wisconsin
Telecommunications companies established in 1999
1999 establishments in Wisconsin